The Victory at Sea Memorial is an Indian memorial constructed after the Indo-Pakistani War of 1971 which is dedicated to the Indian Navy and the Eastern Naval Command sailors. It  was constructed in 1996. It is located on Beach Road, Visakhapatnam.

History
In the 1971 liberation war in East Pakistan, the Pakistan Navy targeted the Visakhapatnam Port to destroy the Indian aircraft carrier  but the Indian Navy sunk the Pakistani submarine PNS Ghazi at the coast of Visakhapatnam and took the first battle victory in that war.

References

Indian military memorials and cemeteries
Tourist attractions in Visakhapatnam
Buildings and structures in Visakhapatnam
Uttarandhra